Fernando Bello may refer to
 Fernando Bello (sailor, born 1924) (Fernando Pinto Coelho de Almeida Bello, 1924–1995), Portuguese Olympic sailor in 1948–64
 Fernando Lima Bello (1931–2021), Portuguese Olympic sailor in 1968–72 and member of the International Olympic Committee
 Fernando Bello (sailor, born 1957) (Fernando Bustorff Silva de Almeida Bello), Portuguese sailor sailing at the 1992 Summer Olympics – Star
 Fernando Bello (footballer) (Blas Fernando Bello, 1910–1974), Argentine football goalkeeper
 José Bello Amigo (José Fernando Bello Amigo Serans, born 1978), Spanish-born Australian football goalkeeper